George Zenati or Georges Zenati born in 1935 in Haifa is a Palestinian-Lebanese academic, researcher and translator. He presented a number of philosophical and intellectual works that discussed various topics, in addition to making several translations, perhaps the most important of which are the works of the French thinker Paul Ricoeur, he died on 22 January 2020.

Biography 
George was born in the Palestinian city of Haifa, from which he was displaced with his family in 1948 to Beirut, where he spent his youthful years, before moving in the late sixties to Paris, to continue his studies, where he obtained a doctorate at the University of Paris in 1972, under the supervision of The thinker Paul Ricoeur, then worked as a teacher at the National University of Zaire of Lubumbashi in Congo between 1973 and 1977, before returning to Beirut to work as a professor of modern and contemporary philosophy and graduate studies, in the faculties of education and literature at the Lebanese University.

Published works 
 Wrote
 1964: , Eternal Thirst, Commercial Office for Printing, Distribution and Publishing
 1993: , Journeys into Western Philosophy, University Foundation for Studies, Publishing and Distribution, 
 2002: , Philosophy on its way, conditions and times for printing, publishing and distribution, 
 2018: , Freedom and Violence, The Arab Center for Research and Policy Studies, 
 2019: , The Philosophy and Impact of Ibn Bajja, The Arab Center for Research and Policy Studies, 

 Translations

 1993: , "The Passions of the Soul", by René Descartes
 2005: , "The Self Same as Other", by Paul Ricoeur
 2008: , "History of Catholicism", by Yves Broglie
 2008: , "History of Byzantium", Jean-Claude Chenet
 2009: , “Memory," “History, Oblivion," by Paul Ricoeur
 2009: , "Moral Philosophy", by Monique Canto-Sperber and Reuven Ojian
 2020: , "Ibn Rushd the Disquieting", Jean-Baptiste Brunet

Awards 
His book "The Same Same as Another" (translated from French into Arabic) won the Sheikh Zayed Book Award in 2007, in the translation category. He also received the King Abdullah bin Abdulaziz International Award for Translation in 2011, in the field of "Humanities from Other Languages ​​into Arabic", for his translation of the book "Memory, History, Oblivion" from the French language, the prize is shared equally with Muhammad Badawi, for his translation of the book "The Interpretation of Cultures" from the English language, by Clifford Geertz.

References 

2021 deaths
1935 births
People from Haifa
Lebanese academics
Palestinian academics
Lebanese male writers
Lebanese translators
Palestinian translators
Palestinian writers
Academic staff of Lebanese University
Lebanese people of Palestinian descent
Palestinian emigrants to Lebanon
French–Arabic translators